Areum-dong is neighborhood of Sejong City, South Korea.

External links
 Areum-dong 

Neighbourhoods in Sejong City